Arlindo dos Santos Cruz (born 26 April 1940), known as just Arlindo, is a Brazilian former footballer.

References

He scored the first goal ever in the famous Estadio Azteca located in Mexico

1943 births
Living people
Brazilian footballers
Association football midfielders
Botafogo de Futebol e Regatas players
Pan American Games medalists in football
Pan American Games gold medalists for Brazil
Footballers at the 1963 Pan American Games
Medalists at the 1963 Pan American Games